WHAA (89.1 FM) is a radio station licensed to Adams, Wisconsin. The station is part of Wisconsin Public Radio (WPR), and airs WPR's "Ideas Network", consisting of news and talk programming. WHAA covers a large previously underserved portion of Southern Central Wisconsin along the Wisconsin River providing city grade WPR reception to areas such as Wisconsin Rapids, Portage, Adams and Juneau counties as well as popular tourist areas such as Wisconsin Dells, Castle Rock Lake and Petenwell Lake.

See also Wisconsin Public Radio

External links
Wisconsin Public Radio

HAA
Wisconsin Public Radio
NPR member stations